The Queen Nandi Mounted Rifles (formerly the Natal Mounted Rifles) is an reserve armoured regiment of the South African Army.

History

Origin
The original and accepted parent unit of the Natal Mounted Rifles is the Royal Durban Rangers which was formed at a meeting of the public in the town of Durban, at Boltbee's Hotel on 23 March 1854. 
Other ante-cedant units that were then subsequently amalgamated into the NMR since 1854 are as follows:

Formation
In May 1868 the Regimental Committee of the Durban Mounted Rifles, presided over by Captain WH Addison, held a meeting to discuss the forming of the Natal Mounted Rifles. The formation of the regiment would entail the amalgamation of four Volunteer Units; Royal D'urban Rangers (1854), Victoria Mounted Rifles (1862), Alexander Mounted Rifles (1865) and Durban Mounted Rifles(1873).

Anglo-Boer War
The regiment was re-activated in Durban during February and March 1901 for service in the South African War. It was originally called the 2nd Natal Volunteer Composite Regiment but the name was soon changed to Natal Mounted Infantry. The unit was armed and equipped by the Natal Volunteer Department and horsed by the Imperial Remount Department. The first depot was at Dundee, but, on the unit changing its name, this was transferred to Newcastle.

World War I
At the outbreak of World War I, the regiment became the 3rd Mounted Rifles and was attached to the 8th Mounted Brigade with the Central Force in the German South West African Campaign. On 1 July 1913 the Regiment was re-amalgamated with the Border Mounted Rifles, renamed the 3rd Mounted Rifles (Natal Mounted Rifles) and transferred to the Active Citizen Force of the Union Defence Force.

World War II
In 1932 the Regiment's name was simplified to The Natal Mounted Rifles and in 1934 it was converted to infantry. The regiment was mounted for 80 years until July 1934 when horses were entirely dispensed with and NMR converted to a machine-gun unit. In January 1934 the regiment was re-mustered as an armoured reconnaissance regiment of the  6th South African Armoured Division.

In addition to the campaigns in which its various constituent units fought in before the Regiment's formation, the Natal Mounted Rifles served in the Second Anglo-Boer War (1899–1902), the Zulu Rebellion (1906–1907), World War I (specifically in South-West Africa from 1914 to 1915), World War II (See 1st SA Infantry Division and South Africa's post-war internal conflicts and the South African Border War).

Post World War II

Border War

Post 1994
Since the 1994 Democratic Elections, the NMR has undergone several training exercises and continues to recruit members into its ranks. It boasts a Regimental Pipe Band and is affiliated to The King's Own Hussars.

Name change
In August 2019, 52 Reserve Force units had their names changed to reflect the diverse military history of South Africa. The Natal Mounted Rifles became the Queen Nandi Mounted Rifles, and have 3 years to design and implement new regimental insignia.

Regimental

Symbols

Regimental mottos:

Previous dress insignia

Alliances
  - affiliated 9 April 1930 to The Queen's Royal Hussars (The Queen's Own and Royal Irish)
 Glenwood Boys High School affiliated to NMR on 17 February 1936
 South African School of Armour affiliated to NMR on 21 March 1997
 Durban Metro Police Equestrian Unit affiliated to NMR on 25 March 2000
 South African Air Force No.15 (Helicopter) Squadron, Durban, affiliated to NMR

Battle honours

 South Africa 1879
 South Africa 1899-1902
 Defence of Ladysmith
 Natal 1906
 South-West Africa 1914-1915
 Gibeon
 East Africa 1940-1941
 Dadaba
 Western Desert 1941-1943
 Gazala
 Springbok Road
 Paliano
 Bir Temrad
 Best Post
 Alamein Defence
 El Alamein
 Italy 1944-1945
 The Tiber
 Celleno
 Florence
 The Greve
 Gothic Line
 Po Valley
 El Yibo (The first action of the NMR in World War II 16–18 January 1940)
 South African Border War 1975-1976

Leadership

Notes

References

Armoured regiments of South Africa
Military units and formations in Durban
Military units and formations established in 2019
Pages with Battle Honours